The Edwin Watts Southwind Park, popularly known as Southwind Park, is an 80-acre (0.3 km2) park within the Springfield Park District in Springfield, Illinois.  It describes itself as a national model park for the demonstration of compliance with the Americans with Disabilities Act (ADA) in the provision of accessibilities to persons with disabilities.

Park features
The park features 2.5 miles of paved, wheelchair-accessible urban trails.  The winding trails provide access to a series of fully accessible park amenities, including a ramped tree house, two ADA-compliant playgrounds, and three fishing piers.  The music podium, Selvaggio Arches, features an automated nightly sound-and-light show.  The park's banquet hall, Erin's Pavilion, is accessible to rent for special events.

The nearest limited-highway access is Exit 90 on Interstate 55.

References

Parks in Illinois
Protected areas of Sangamon County, Illinois
Tourist attractions in Springfield, Illinois